The Kan Imam San ("San" often romanized as Sann) are an Islamic sect that make up about 10% of the population of ethnic Chams in Cambodia. Their spiritual and officially recognized administrative center is the Tralach District of Kampong Chhnang Province, particularly the Au Russey (or Orussey) Mosque, but their historic mosque atop Phnom Oudong is the home to many of their most important rituals and festivals. They are also notably represented in Pursat and Battambang provinces — a geographic trace of villages following the southern side of the Tonlé Sap lake, extending northwest from the Tralach District in Kampong Chhnang — with small numbers in Kandal, Kampot, and Kratie Provinces.

Since 1998, they are officially recognized by the Cambodian government as one of two Muslim groups in Cambodia and typically referred to as the "Bani" or "Chambani." Internally, they often refer to themselves as the "Friday Group" due to only praying and visiting their mosque on Fridays. This distinction is also their most noteworthy characteristic to the 90% of Cambodian Muslims who pray five times per day, in line with most Islamic practices around the globe.

References 

Islam in Cambodia